Kao the Kangaroo is a platform video game developed and published by Tate Multimedia was released in May 2022 for Nintendo Switch, PlayStation 4, PlayStation 5, Windows, Xbox One and Xbox Series X/S. It is the fourth installment of the franchise, a reboot of the series, and the first title released after Kao the Kangaroo: Mystery of the Volcano in 2005.

Gameplay 
Kao the Kangaroo is a third-person 3D action platformer where players control Kao as he moves and jumps across obstacles and suspended platforms in a variety of environments. He is able to attack enemies using his boxing gloves as well as explore hidden areas for collectibles.

Story 
Set in a world of anthropomorphic animals, a kangaroo fighter named Kao sets off on a journey to search for his missing sister, Kaia, and discover the secret of his long-lost father, Koby. To do this, he must battle the famous "fighting masters" who are being influenced by a dark power, and ultimately face the powerful Eternal Warrior who threatens the balance of the world.

Development 
Kao the Kangaroo is developed and published by Polish studio Tate Multimedia who previously created every other title in the Kao series. The game was announced in June 2020, which marked the 20th anniversary of the series, with the first concept art and information surfacing the following September. Development started shortly after the series' second game, Kao the Kangaroo: Round 2, was re-released on Steam in 2019 following a trending #BringKaoBack campaign on social media. Tate Multimedia was surprised by the games sales on the platform, which lead them to decide to create a new installment. The team prototyped a number of ideas, including a remake of the third game in the series, Mystery of the Volcano, and a combat-focused game starring a much older Kao. Eventually, the team decided to make the project a reboot, with Tate Multimedia publishing head Kaja Borówko saying that it is a completely different take on the story and on the character. The announcement was followed by a short gameplay clip showing early footage Kao in a jungle environment. Tate Multimedia developed Kao using Unreal Engine 4. Although the game was originally intended to be released in 2021, the developers later pushed the release to 2022. The game launched for Nintendo Switch, PlayStation 4, PlayStation 5, Windows, Xbox One, and Xbox Series X/S on May 27, 2022.

Reception 

Kao the Kangaroo received "mixed or average" reviews, according to review aggregator Metacritic.

Destructoid gave the title a 7 out of 10 and praised its scope, character designs, art style, controls, level design, and stage backgrounds, while taking minor issue with its story and voice acting. Game Informer lamented the game's difficulty, overworld design, abilities, and technical issues while comparing it unfavorably to the Mario, Crash Bandicoot, and Ratchet & Clank franchises. Hardcore Gamer felt that the level design was "easily the biggest highlight" but similarly cited the game's voice acting, soundtrack, and bugs as its major flaws. IGN gave the game a 7 out of 10, saying that Kao the Kangaroo doesn't try too hard to be gimmicky, packing a colourful aesthetic and light-hearted humor to carry it through the parts where it feels unoriginal. Nintendo Life appreciated the level designs, combat, collectibles, and characters, but stated that the game's camera and performance were subpar. Push Square found the game to be a decent 3D platformer with fun glove powers, enjoyably simple design, and nice music and visuals, but thought the presentation was sloppy with glitches, occasionally awkward gameplay, poor writing, and inadequate voice acting. Shacknews was fond of Kao the Kangaroo's character designs, visuals, sense of humor, and glove-incorporating combat, but criticized the pop-in, performance issues, buggy gameplay, voice acting, in-game camera, and visual design. Pure Xbox found the game to be better than expected, with fun platforming and enjoyable combat, but thought that it felt low-budget on the whole, clunky, and frustrating at times.

References

External links 
 
 
 
  at Steam

2022 video games
Open-world video games
Action-adventure games
Single-player video games
Video game reboots
Windows games
Platform games
Xbox One games
3D platform games
PlayStation 4 games
PlayStation 5 games
Unreal Engine games
Nintendo Switch games
Xbox Series X and Series S games
Kao the Kangaroo
Video games about kangaroos and wallabies
Video games about siblings
Video games about families
Video games about revenge
Video games set in Australia
Australian outback
Jungles in fiction
Video games developed in Poland